The 2010 Montreux Volley Masters was held in Montreux, Switzerland between 8–13 June 2010. 8 teams participated in this tournament.

Participating teams

Group stage

Group A

Table

|}

Results

Group B

Table

|}

Results

Classification round

5th–8th place

5th–6th place

Final round

Semifinals

3rd place match

Final

Final standings

Awards
Winners:
 MVP:  Kenia Carcaces
 Best Scorer:  Kenia Carcaces
 Best Spiker:  Tatiana Kosheleva
 Best Blocker:  Berenika Okuniewska
 Best Setter:  Wei Qiuyue
 Best Server:  Chen Liyi
 Best Receiver:  Hui Ruoqi
 Best Libero:  Nicole Davis

References

External links
 Official Page of 2010 Montreux Volley Masters

Montreux Volley Masters
Montreux Volley Masters
Montreux Volley Masters